César Muñoz Martín-Calvo (born 19 July 1975), commonly known as César, is a former Spanish futsal player who played as a defender.

Honors
1 Recopa de Europa (06/07)
1 División de Honor de Futsal (99/00)
4 Copa de España de Futsal (1998, 1999, 2000, 2006)
4 Supercopa de España de Futsal (1994, 1998, 1999 y 2000)
1 Futsal European Clubs Championship (2000)
2 Intercontinental Futsal Cup (2000, 2011)
1 Copa Xunta de Galicia (2005)

References

External links
lnfs.es

1975 births
Living people
Sportspeople from Madrid
Spanish men's futsal players
Caja Segovia FS players
MFK Dinamo Moskva players
Playas de Castellón FS players
Santiago Futsal players
Luparense Calcio a 5 players
Inter FS players